The Little Missouri River, or Little Mo, is a  waterway that runs from the Ouachita Mountains of southwest Arkansas into the rolling hills area in the surrounding countryside.

Overview 
The Little Missouri River is a rocky mountain river that flows through narrow forested canyons. This river has numerous small waterfalls, crystal clear water, and outstanding scenery including towering rocky bluffs crowned with pine.

The Little Missouri River was so named because its lower reaches were said to remind early French explorers of the Missouri River.

Location
Mouth Confluence with the Ouachita River in Ouachita County, Arkansas 
Source Mountains of Polk County, Arkansas

Course 
The Little Missouri flows in a generally north-to-south direction through Pike, Clark, and Montgomery on the western side of the Ouachita River.  The Little Missouri River is south of, and runs parallel to, the Caddo River, before flowing into the Ouachita River above Camden, Arkansas.  The largest tributary of the Little Missouri River is the Antoine River.  The Little Missouri River is intermittently navigable to small boats below its confluence with the Antoine River, although it is rarely used.

The Little Missouri River is dammed by Narrows Dam and forms Lake Greeson. This makes the upper waters of the river excellent for experienced canoers. This segment contains the Winding Stair Rapid, which is classified as a Class IV rapid on the International Scale of River Difficulty. Another attraction on the upper river is Little Missouri Falls, a staircasestep fall that attracts photographers and visitors. The upper reaches of the Little Missouri were considered so scenic that the area was once approved by Congress to become Ouachita National Park, until this action was vetoed by President Herbert Hoover. The watershed of the Little Missouri River is quite small, which means that its upper reaches ordinarily contain little water during the dry summer months.

The Little Missouri River is a superior fishing stream for rainbow trout, green sunfish, longear sunfish, smallmouth bass, spotted bass, and other species. The area below the dam at Lake Greeson is most popular for trout fishermen.

Portions of the Little Missouri River flow through the Ouachita National Forest, and the lower segment flows past the Crater of Diamonds State Park. The Albert Pike Campground provides camping facilities for visitors to the area.

The Little Missouri is listed as a "Wild and Scenic River" by the United States Forest Service. The upper reaches of the river are designated as an "Arkansas Natural and Scenic River" by the State.

History 
The Little Missouri flows through territory once occupied by the mound-building Caddo people. 

During the night of June 10–11, 2010 a flash flood along Little Missouri killed at least eighteen people in the campgrounds of the Albert Pike Recreational Area.

See also
List of Arkansas rivers

References

External links 
Little Missouri River and Lake Greeson

Rivers of Arkansas
Tributaries of the Red River of the South
Ouachita Mountains
Rivers of Clark County, Arkansas
Rivers of Montgomery County, Arkansas
Rivers of Nevada County, Arkansas
Rivers of Ouachita County, Arkansas
Rivers of Pike County, Arkansas
Wild and Scenic Rivers of the United States
Ouachita River